Pavel Jungwirth (born 20 May 1966 in Prague, Czech Republic) is a Czech organic chemist. Since 2004, he has been the head of the Senior Research Group at the Institute of Organic Chemistry and Biochemistry of the Czech Academy of Sciences. He has also been a professor in the Faculty of Mathematics and Physics at Charles University since 2000. He has also been a senior editor of the Journal of Physical Chemistry since 2009. He is popularly known for studying the explosive reaction between alkali metals, such as sodium and potassium, and water; his research on this subject indicates that these reactions result from a Coulomb explosion. He and his colleagues have also discovered a way to slow down this reaction, which they used to determine the source of a blue flash that is briefly produced during the reaction.

Pavel Jungwirth is a coordinator of an international science competition Dream Chemistry Award.

References

Czech chemists
Living people
1966 births
Charles University alumni
Academic staff of Charles University
Scientists from Prague
Organic chemists

Institute of Organic Chemistry and Biochemistry of the CAS